Rubén González Rocha (born 29 January 1982), sometimes known simply as Rubén, is a Spanish former professional footballer who played as a central defender. 

He came through the youth ranks at Real Madrid, but appeared in only 11 official matches in four years. He amassed La Liga totals of 118 games and five goals during ten seasons, also representing Albacete, Racing de Santander, Mallorca and Osasuna.

Club career
González was born in Santiago de Compostela, Galicia. A youth product of La Liga powerhouse Real Madrid, who signed him from local SD Compostela, he would only amass four first-team league appearances in three seasons, his debut coming on 10 May 2002 in a 0–3 away loss against Deportivo de La Coruña. On 9 November 2003 he was taken out after just 25 minutes and an own goal, in an eventual 1–4 defeat at Sevilla FC; he finished 2003–04 on loan to German club Borussia Mönchengladbach, appearing rarely due to a shoulder injury.

After a loan period with Albacete Balompié in 2004–05, with the Castile-La Mancha side finishing dead last in the top flight, Rubén returned to Real Madrid, spending the following campaign with the reserves in Segunda División. In 2006–07 he finally developed as a top-level player with Racing de Santander, helping the Cantabrians finish tenth while scoring his first goals in the competition in consecutive 2–1 wins, against RCD Mallorca and Villarreal CF; however, he returned the next year to division two, joining RC Celta de Vigo.

In late August 2009, González signed with Mallorca, arriving for free in a 2+1 deal. In his first season he played mostly as a backup to José Nunes and Iván Ramis, but still managed to net twice, which resulted in four points away from home (2–1 win defeat of Real Valladolid, 1–1 draw to Real Zaragoza); he added his third on 19 April 2010 – all came through headers from corner kicks – in a 2–0 home victory over CA Osasuna, as the Balearic Islands team finished fifth and qualified for the UEFA Europa League.

After one season with Baku FC in the Azerbaijan Premier League, González agreed to a two-year contract at Zaragoza on 12 August 2014, arriving from the same club as compatriot Mario. On 3 September 2016, the 34-year-old moved to the Indian Super League after joining Delhi Dynamos FC. 

González returned to his homeland in the 2017 January transfer window, signing with Coruxo FC from Segunda División B.

Honours

Club
Real Madrid
La Liga: 2002–03
Supercopa de España: 2003
UEFA Champions League: 2001–02

International
Spain U16
UEFA European Under-16 Championship: 1999

References

External links

1982 births
Living people
Spanish footballers
Footballers from Santiago de Compostela
Association football defenders
La Liga players
Segunda División players
Segunda División B players
Real Madrid Castilla footballers
Real Madrid CF players
Albacete Balompié players
Racing de Santander players
RC Celta de Vigo players
RCD Mallorca players
CA Osasuna players
Real Zaragoza players
Coruxo FC players
Bundesliga players
Borussia Mönchengladbach players
Azerbaijan Premier League players
FC Baku players
Indian Super League players
Odisha FC players
UEFA Champions League winning players
Spain youth international footballers
Spain under-21 international footballers
Spanish expatriate footballers
Expatriate footballers in Germany
Expatriate footballers in Azerbaijan
Expatriate footballers in India
Spanish expatriate sportspeople in Germany
Spanish expatriate sportspeople in Azerbaijan
Spanish expatriate sportspeople in India